Half a Life may refer to:

 Half a Life (Bulychov book), a 1978 anthology of science fiction by Kir Bulychov
 Half a Life (film), a 1982 film by Romain Goupil
 Half a Life (novel), a 2001 novel by V.S. Naipaul
 Half a Life (memoir), a 2011 memoir by Darin Strauss
 "Half a Life" (Star Trek: The Next Generation), a 1991 episode

See also

 Half-life (disambiguation)